Paulina Paszek (born 26 October 1997) is a German  and former Polish sprint canoeist.

She participated at the 2018 ICF Canoe Sprint World Championships, winning a medal.

References

External links
 

Living people
1997 births
German female canoeists
Polish female canoeists
ICF Canoe Sprint World Championships medalists in kayak
Sportspeople from Bielsko-Biała
20th-century Polish women
21st-century Polish women